Lake Shore High School is a high school located in the lakefront community of St. Clair Shores, Michigan. The school, a part of Lake Shore Public Schools, serves grades 9–12. The mascot for Lake Shore are the Shorians. Lake Shore High School offers training in CAD, dental careers, web design and video production along with college advance placement classes and dual enrollment. Lake Shore High School, along with all of the other district schools have been remodeled and equipped with technologically to serve students. Janelle Bross is the current principal with John Hartley and Todd Stevens as the current assistant principals.

Extracurriculars

Sports 
Sports were active for the boys when the main school building opened in the mid-1920s. Girls' sports came to light in the early 1970s. Lake Shore is best known, athletically, for the 1993 and 1994 Boys' Basketball team that went 26–1 and 28–0, respectively, and winning the Class B State Championship in 1994. As of December 2013 they were the only Boys Basketball team located in Macomb County to ever win the State Championship. The '1974' Lake Shore Hockey Team also won their only 'State Championship' with the final game being played at Yost Arena in Ann Arbor, Michigan.

Music 
The school hosts three different band classes: Jazz Band, Symphonic Band and Wind Ensemble. For concerts, graduation ceremony, and competition at MSBOA, Symphonic Band and Wind Ensemble are combined into Wind Symphony. The choral program is one of the highest membership programs at Lake Shore, and includes the Woman's Chorale, Lake Shore Singers, Show Choir and Glee Club. The choirs also combine each spring to produce a musical; they performed their first musical in 1973.

Notable alumni 
 George Allen (1937) – American football coach in the National Football League and United States Football League; member of the Pro Football Hall of Fame
 John Ziegler, Jr. (1952) – President of the National Hockey League (1977–1992) and member of the Hockey Hall of Fame (1987)
 Alto Reed (1966) – Saxophonist, member of Bob Seger and the Silver Bullet Band
 Candice S. Miller (1972) – Michigan Secretary of State, United States House of Representatives
 Faye Grant (1975) – actress
 Mark Wells (1975) – member of the 1980 Miracle on Ice U.S. Men's Olympic Ice Hockey team
 Thomas J. Wilson (1975) – Chairman and Chief Executive Officer, The Allstate Corporation
 Donald Patrick Harvey (1978) – actor (Die Hard 2, Walker, Texas Ranger)
 Anne Fletcher (1984) – dancer, choreographer and film director
 Rachelle Wilkos (1989) – American television producer

References

External links 
 Lake Shore High School

Public high schools in Michigan
Educational institutions established in 1923
Schools in Macomb County, Michigan
1923 establishments in Michigan